is a Japanese singer and model. She is the captain of Japanese idol group Hinatazaka46. She is represented by Sony Music Records, and is an exclusive model for the fashion magazine Ray.

Career

Music 
Sasaki's musical career began on 11 May 2016, when she passed the auditions for new members of Keyakizaka46's subgroup Hiragana Keyakizaka46, which was hosted on the streaming platform Showroom. Sasaki, along with ten other people that passed the audition, joined Neru Nagahama in Hiragana Keyakizaka46 and was known as the "first generation". Her first concert occurred on 28 October of the same year at Akasaka Blitz, where she performed Kanji Keyakizaka46's songs "Silent Majority" and "Sekai ni wa Ai Shika Nai", as well as Hiragana Keyakizaka46's own "Hiragana Keyaki".

During her time at Hiragana Keyakizaka46, she has consistently appeared in every single between "Sekai ni wa Ai Shika Nai" and "Kuroi Hitsuji". On 3 June 2018, she was named captain of Hiragana Keyakizaka46. She has also appeared in every Hinatazaka46 single to date. On January 24, 2021, she announced that her fandom name would be .

Other ventures 
In February 2019, she became an exclusive model for the fashion magazine Ray. Her first fashion show appearance was the 27th Tokyo Girls Collection Autumn/Winter event, which took place on 1 September 2018.

On 18 September 2019, Sasaki hosted the 2019 MTV Video Music Awards Japan along with fellow Hinatazaka46 members Mirei Sasaki, Nao Kosaka, and Miho Watanabe.

Sasaki is a fan of the manga series One Piece. In December 2020, she released an original set of stamps for the messaging application Line based on the series, as part of the "LINE Creators Collaboration x One Piece" campaign. On September 3, 2021, she also participated in a collaboration event between the series and the JAXA space agency to commemorate the series's 1000th chapter, which featured the manga characters visiting the Kibō space module.

Filmography

Variety and talk shows

Discography

Keyakizaka46 singles

Keyakizaka46 albums 
The songs listed below are not included in any singles above.

Hinatazaka46 singles

Videography

Video albums

References

External links 
  
  (August 2, 2016 - ) 
  on Showroom 
  (March 27, 2022 - ) 

Japanese idols
Hinatazaka46 members
Japanese female models
Musicians from Chiba Prefecture
1996 births
Living people